Collections is a compilation album by hip-hop group Cypress Hill. It was released in 2008 and forms part of Sony Music's budget Collections series. The album consists of singles and album tracks taken from Black Sunday, Cypress Hill III: Temples of Boom, Cypress Hill IV and  Stoned Raiders.

Track listing

Notes
(*) Although not credited as such, "Tequilla Sunrise" was the 'Radio Edit' version.

References

External links
[ Collections at Allmusic]

Cypress Hill albums
Albums produced by DJ Muggs
2008 compilation albums